Litoria amnicola, the Raja Ampat torrent tree frog, is a frog in the family Hylidae, endemic to Indonesia.  It has been found on Salawati Island, which is in the Raja Ampat archipelago.

Original description

References

Amphibians described in 2021
Endemic fauna of Indonesia
Frogs of Asia
amnicola